Pierre Magnon (born 9 May 1996) is a French professional footballer who plays as a midfielder for  club Avranches.

Club career
Magnon's father died when Pierre was 12, he joined the Bréquigny boarding school and football team at age 14, and he joined Brest at the age of 17. He signed his first professional contract in June 2016. Magnon made his professional debut for Brest in a Ligue 2 1–1 tie with US Orléans on 30 March 2018.

Magnon joined US Avranches in the summer of 2019.

References

External links
 
 
 L'Equipe Profile

1996 births
Living people
Sportspeople from Saint-Malo
French footballers
Association football midfielders
Stade Brestois 29 players
US Avranches players
Ligue 2 players
Championnat National players
Championnat National 3 players
Footballers from Brittany